Lavigny is the name of several places:

in France:
Lavigny, a commune of the Jura département 
in Switzerland:
Lavigny, a Swiss commune in the canton of Vaud